Kiros Stanlley Soares Ferraz (born 21 August 1988), known as just Kiros, is a Brazilian football player. He plays for Gol Gohar Sirjan in the Persian Gulf Pro League.

Career
Kiros played the majority of his career in the Brazilian State Leagues with occasional appearances in the second, third, and fourth divisions. Kiros joined J2 League club Kyoto Sanga FC in 2016. In August 2017, Kiros signed a contract with Persian Gulf Pro League side Zob Ahan. He signed a 3 years contract with Sepahan in summer 2018 and became league top scorer at the first season.

Sepahan
He signed a 3 years contract with Sepahan In May 2018 and became league top scorer at the first season.

Honours

Individual
Persian Gulf Pro League Top Scorer: 2018–19

References

External links

1988 births
Living people
Brazilian footballers
Brazilian expatriate footballers
Expatriate footballers in Japan
Brazilian expatriate sportspeople in Japan
Expatriate footballers in Iran
Brazilian expatriate sportspeople in Iran
J2 League players
Persian Gulf Pro League players
Santa Cruz Futebol Clube players
Paysandu Sport Club players
Salgueiro Atlético Clube players
Clube Atlético Bragantino players
Clube do Remo players
Resende Futebol Clube players
América Futebol Clube (RN) players
Kyoto Sanga FC players
Zob Ahan Esfahan F.C. players
Sepahan S.C. footballers
Gol Gohar players
Association football forwards